The Broadway is a performance venue in Barking town centre. The building was previously a facility known as Barking Assembly Hall, forming part of Barking Town Hall.

History
The building formed part of the Barking Town Hall complex and was completed in 1961. It was officially opened by Tom Driberg MP as Barking Assembly Hall in May 1961.

Sir Adrian Boult conducted the London Philharmonic Orchestra in the assembly hall on 26 November 1969.

In 1971, the renowned Canadian singer songwriter Neil Young recorded two tracks from Harvest, his best selling and most famous album, at the Broadway when it was known as Barking Assembly Hall (but is credited as Barking Town Hall on the album notes.) Young recorded these two tracks "A Man Needs a Maid" and "There's a World" for his Harvest album in Barking with Jack Nitzsche and the London Symphony Orchestra. in March 1971. The album was released on 1 February 1972.

It was remodeled as an arts centre and auditorium with a seated capacity of 341, designed by Tim Foster Architects, in 2006. The venue is managed by Barking and Dagenham College and aims to improve access to arts facilities in the London Borough of Barking and Dagenham and the surrounding areas of east London. The Broadway is also home to Barking & Dagenham College's Performing Arts School.

References

External links
 The Broadway
 Herrmann Photo Tour:London Retrieved April 11, 2007
 "From Broadway to Barking" Citizen Magazine - March 2004. Retrieved April 11, 2007

Barking, London
Theatre in London
Music venues in London
Theatres in the London Borough of Barking and Dagenham